Fame was an American magazine founded in New York City in 1988. It focused on celebrity profiles, interviews, and photos along with general-interest stories.

Overview
The magazine was owned by its publisher, Steven Greenberg, and edited by Gael Love, who had previously worked on Andy Warhol's Interview magazine. 

In 1989 Fame notably published an unauthorized index to The Andy Warhol Diaries, but was beaten to publication by Spy magazine, which released its own index a month earlier.

Fame was published for two years, with its final Winter 1991 issue released at the end of 1990.

References

External links
Net Worth Of Celebrities

Monthly magazines published in the United States
1988 establishments in New York City
1991 disestablishments in New York (state)
Celebrity magazines published in the United States
Defunct magazines published in the United States
Magazines established in 1988
Magazines disestablished in 1991
Magazines published in New York City